Ragweeds are flowering plants in the genus Ambrosia in the aster family, Asteraceae. They are distributed in the tropical and subtropical regions of the Americas, especially North America, where the origin and center of diversity of the genus are in the southwestern United States and northwestern Mexico. Several species have been introduced to the Old World and some have naturalized and have become invasive species. Ragweed species are expected to continue spreading across Europe in the near future in response to ongoing climate change.

Other common names include bursages and burrobrushes. The genus name is from the Greek ambrosia, meaning "food or drink of immortality".

Ragweed pollen is notorious for causing allergic reactions in humans, specifically allergic rhinitis. Up to half of all cases of pollen-related allergic rhinitis in North America are caused by ragweeds.

The most widespread species of the genus in North America is Ambrosia artemisiifolia.

Description and ecology
Ragweeds are annual and perennial herbs and shrubs. Species may grow just a few centimeters tall or exceed four meters in height. The stems are erect, decumbent or prostrate, and many grow from rhizomes. The leaves may be arranged alternately, oppositely, or both. The leaf blades come in many shapes, sometimes divided pinnately or palmately into lobes. The edges are smooth or toothed. Some are hairy, and most are glandular.

Ragweeds are monoecious, most producing inflorescences that contain both staminate and pistillate flowers. Inflorescences are often in the form of a spike or raceme made up mostly of staminate flowers with some pistillate clusters around the base. Staminate flower heads have stamens surrounded by whitish or purplish florets. Pistillate flower heads have fruit-yielding ovules surrounded by many phyllaries and fewer, smaller florets. The pistillate flowers are wind pollinated, and the fruits develop. They are burs, sometimes adorned with knobs, wings, or spines.

Many Ambrosia species occur in desert and semi-desert areas, and many are ruderal species that grow in disturbed habitat types.

Allergy

Ragweed pollen is a common allergen. A single plant may produce about a billion grains of pollen per season, and the pollen is transported on the wind. It causes about half of all cases of pollen-associated allergic rhinitis in North America, where ragweeds are most abundant and diverse. Common culprits are common ragweed (A. artemisiifolia) and great ragweed (A. trifida).

Concentration of ragweed pollen—in the absence of significant rainfall, which removes pollen from the air, is the lowest in the early morning hours (6:00 AM), when emissions starts. Pollen concentration peaks at midday. Ragweed pollen can remain airborne for days and travel great distances, and can even be carried  out to sea. Ragweeds native to the Americas have been introduced to Europe starting in the nineteenth century and especially during World War I, and have spread rapidly since the 1950s. Eastern Europe, particularly Hungary, has been badly affected by ragweed since the early 1990s, when the dismantling of Communist collective agriculture led to large-scale abandonment of agricultural land, and new building projects also resulted in disturbed, un-landscaped areas.

The major allergenic compound in the pollen has been identified as Amb a 1, a 38 kDa nonglycosylated protein composed of two subunits. It also contains other allergenic components, such as profilin and calcium-binding proteins.

Ragweed allergy sufferers may show signs of oral allergy syndrome, a food allergy classified by a cluster of allergic reactions in the mouth in response to the consumption certain fruits, vegetables, and nuts. Foods commonly involved include beans, celery, cumin, hazelnuts, kiwifruit, parsley, potatoes, bananas, melons, cucumbers, and zucchini. Because cooking usually denatures the proteins that cause the reaction, the foods are more allergenic when eaten raw; exceptions are celery and nuts, which may not be safe even when cooked. Signs of reaction can include itching, burning, and swelling of the mouth and throat, runny eyes and nose, hives, and, less commonly, vomiting, diarrhea, asthma, and anaphylaxis. These symptoms are due to the abnormal increase of IgE antibodies which attach to a type of immune cell called mast cells.  When the ragweed antigen then attaches to these antibodies the mast cells release histamine and other symptom evoking chemicals.

Merck & Co, under license from allergy immunotherapy (AIT) company ALK, has launched a ragweed allergy immunotherapy treatment in sublingual tablet form in the US and Canada.  

As of 2006, research into allergy immunotherapy treatment involved administering doses of the allergen to accustom the body to induce specific long-term tolerance.

Control and eradication
Chemical spraying has been used for control in large areas. Because ragweed only reacts to some of the more aggressive herbicides, it is highly recommended to consult professionals when deciding on dosage and methodology, especially near urban areas. Effective active ingredients include those that are glyphosate-based (Roundup, Glyphogan, Glialka), sulfosate-based (Medallon), and glufosinate ammonium-based (Finale 14SL). In badly infested areas,  are usually dispersed. In 2007 several Ambrosia artemisiifolia populations were glyphosate resistant, exclusively in the USA.

Where herbicides cannot be used, mowing may be repeated about every three weeks, as it grows back rapidly. In the past, ragweed was usually cut down, left to dry, and then burned. This method is used less often now, because of the pollution caused by smoke. Manually uprooting ragweed is generally ineffective, and skin contact can cause allergic reaction. If uprooting is the method of choice, it should be performed before flowering. There is evidence that mechanical and chemical control methods are actually no more effective in the long run than leaving the weed in place.

Fungal rusts and the leaf-eating beetle Ophraella communa have been proposed as agents of biological pest control of ragweeds, but the latter may also attack sunflowers, and applications for permits and funding to test these controls have been unsuccessful. The beetle has, however, appeared in Europe, either on its own or as an uncontrolled introduction, and it has started making a dent into
Ambrosia populations there.

Species

There are about 50 species in genus Ambrosia. Species include:

 Ambrosia acanthicarpa Hook. – flatspine bur ragweed, annual bursage, sand bursage
 Ambrosia acuminata (Brandegee) W.W.Payne
 Ambrosia ambrosioides (Cav.) W.W.Payne – ambrosia-leaf bur ragweed, big bursage, ambrosia bursage
 Ambrosia arborescens Mill. – marko, altamisa
 Ambrosia artemisiifolia L. – common ragweed, short ragweed, Roman wormwood
 Ambrosia artemisioides Meyen & Walp.
 Ambrosia bidentata Michx. – lanceleaf ragweed, southern ragweed
 Ambrosia bryantii (Curran) Payne
 Ambrosia camphorata (Greene) W.W.Payne
 Ambrosia canescens A.Gray – hairy ragweed
 Ambrosia carduacea (Greene) W.W.Payne
 Ambrosia chamissonis (Less.) Greene – silver burr ragweed, beach-bur
 Ambrosia cheiranthifolia A.Gray – Rio Grande ragweed, South Texas ambrosia
 Ambrosia chenopodiifolia (Benth.) W.W.Payne – San Diego bur ragweed, San Diego bursage
 Ambrosia confertiflora DC. – weakleaf bur ragweed
 Ambrosia cordifolia (A.Gray) W.W.Payne – Tucson bur ragweed, heartleaf bursage
 Ambrosia deltoidea (Torr.) W.W.Payne – triangle bur ragweed, triangle bursage
 Ambrosia dentata (Cabrera) M.O.Dillon
 Ambrosia divaricata (Brandegee) Payne
 Ambrosia diversifolia (Piper) Rydb.
 Ambrosia dumosa (A.Gray) W.W.Payne – burrobush, white bursage
 Ambrosia eriocentra (A.Gray) W.W.Payne – woolly fruit bur ragweed, hollyleaf bursage
 Ambrosia flexuosa (A.Gray) W.W.Payne
 Ambrosia grayi (A.Nelson) Shinners – woollyleaf bur ragweed, lagoonweed
 Ambrosia × helenae Rouleau – Helen ragweed
 Ambrosia hispida Pursh – coastal ragweed
 Ambrosia humi León de la Luz & Rebman 
 Ambrosia ilicifolia (A.Gray) W.W.Payne – hollyleaf bur ragweed
 Ambrosia × intergradiens W.H.Wagner – intergrading ragweed
 Ambrosia johnstoniorum Henrickson
 Ambrosia linearis (Rydb.) W.W.Payne – streaked bur ragweed
 Ambrosia magdalenae (Brandegee) W.W.Payne
 Ambrosia maritima L.
 Ambrosia microcephala DC.
 Ambrosia monogyra (Torr. & A.Gray) Strother & B.G.Baldwin – singlewhorl burrobrush
 Ambrosia nivea (B.L.Rob. & Fernald) W.W.Payne
 Ambrosia pannosa W.W.Payne
 Ambrosia peruviana Willd. – ragweed, altamisa
 Ambrosia × platyspina (Seaman) Strother & B.G.Baldwin
 Ambrosia polystachya DC.
 Ambrosia psilostachya DC. – Cuman ragweed, western ragweed, perennial ragweed
 Ambrosia pumila (Nutt.) A.Gray – dwarf bur ragweed, San Diego ambrosia
 Ambrosia salsola (Torr. & A. Gray) Strother & B.G. Baldwin
 Ambrosia scabra Hook. & Arn.
 Ambrosia tacorensis Meyen
 Ambrosia tarapacana Phil.
 Ambrosia tenuifolia Spreng. – slimleaf bur ragweed, lacy ambrosia
 Ambrosia tomentosa Nutt. – skeletonleaf bur ragweed
 Ambrosia trifida L. – great ragweed, giant ragweed
 Ambrosia velutina O.E.Schulz
 Ambrosia villosissima Forssk.

See also
 List of Lepidoptera that feed on ragweeds

References

External links
 
 GRIN Species Records of Ambrosia . Germplasm Resources Information Network (GRIN).

 
Allergology
Ruderal species
Taxa named by Carl Linnaeus